Nikolay Nikolayevich Kalinsky (born 22 September 1993) is a Russian football player who plays as a central midfielder or defensive midfielder for FC Pari Nizhny Novgorod.

Club career
He made his debut in the Russian Professional Football League for FC Kaluga on 22 August 2013 in a game against FC Metallurg-Oskol Stary Oskol.

He made his Russian Premier League debut for FC SKA-Khabarovsk on 24 July 2017 in a game against FC Arsenal Tula.

Career statistics

References

External links
 
 

1995 births
Footballers from Moscow
Living people
Russian footballers
Russia youth international footballers
Association football midfielders
FC Lokomotiv Moscow players
FC SKA-Khabarovsk players
FC Tom Tomsk players
FC Nizhny Novgorod (2015) players
Russian Premier League players
Russian First League players
Russian Second League players